The men's hammer throw event took place on July 9, 2011 at the Kobe Universiade Memorial Stadium.

Results

References
Results

2011 Asian Athletics Championships
Hammer throw at the Asian Athletics Championships